Court Theatre is a Tony Award-winning professional theatre company located in the Hyde Park neighborhood of Chicago, Illinois, where it was established in 1955. Court Theatre is affiliated with the University of Chicago, receiving in-kind support from the University and operating within the larger University umbrella. Court Theatre puts on five plays per season, which are attended by over 35,000 people each year, in addition to various smaller performance events such as play readings.

History 
Charles Newell has been Artistic Director since 1994. In 2018, Angel Ysaguirre joined Court Theatre's leadership as executive director.

In 2010, Court Theatre established itself as the Center for Classic Theatre at the University of Chicago. As explained on the theatre's website, through this position, Court Theatre is "dedicated to the curation of large-scale, interdisciplinary theatrical experiences". Court Theatre has used the University as a resource in many ways, including through the development of new translations and adaptations of classic texts, receiving dramaturgical assistance from expert faculty, and hosting events related to the theatre's programming throughout the University's campus and the greater Hyde Park area. Court Theatre also provides resources for the University as well, including by exclusively providing numerous internships to University of Chicago students as well as maintaining a number of University affiliates on their Board of Trustees.

On June 12, 2022 Charles Newell, Marilyn F. Vitale Artistic Director, and Executive Director Angel Ysaguirre accepted the 2022 Regional Theatre Tony Award on behalf of Court Theatre at Radio City Music Hall.

Notable productions 
Court has won over 70 Jeff Awards, including 8 awards for Best Production for the following shows:

The Tempest (1978), directed by Robert Falls

The Triumph of Love (1994), directed by Charles Newell

Putting It Together (1998), directed by Gary Griffin

Man of La Mancha (2006), directed by Charles Newell

Fences (2006), directed by Ron OJ Parson

Caroline, or Change (2009), directed by Charles Newell

Blues for an Alabama Sky (2017), directed by Ron OJ Parson

King Hedley II (2020), directed by Ron OJ Parson

References

Chicago Tribune. March 6, 2008. Court Theatre's Newell will be busy on the boards. By Chris Jones. Retrieved 2008-03-16
Chicago Tribune, February 29, 2008. Murder, mayhem at Court Theatre--and now a carnival ride. Retrieved 2008-03-16
Chicago Tribune, May 22, 2006. Court Theatre troupe can't quite balance 'Lettice and Lovage'.
Chicago Sun-Times,  April 4, 2005. Art's effect on history propels Court Theatre's captivating 'Travesties'. Review by Kevin Nance
Court Theatre's 'Thyestes' broadens the gory details. By Chris Jones, Tribune theater critic. October 1, 2007. Retrieved 2008-03-16
 The New York Times, Travel Guides: Chicago - Court Theatre 
Court Theatre 2009-2010 Season press release

External links

University of Chicago
Theatre companies in Chicago
League of Resident Theatres